Charles A. Colton was the first director of Newark Technical School (now the New Jersey Institute of Technology) from 1881 until 1918.

References
 

New Jersey Institute of Technology faculty
Year of birth missing
Year of death missing